BYU Magazine is the alumni magazine of Brigham Young University (BYU) in Provo, Utah, United States. It is published quarterly and is edited by Peter B. Gardner.

History
The first alumni publication for BYU was the Alumni Announcer, which began publication in 1923. It was quickly replaced by another short-lived work in 1925, the Y Alumnus, which only survived until 1927.  Nearly two decades later, in 1945, a new publication surfaced and was named the Brigham Young Alumnus. The new magazine achieved a circulation of 13,000 within its first year and, unlike is predecessors, continued being produced for many years.

By 1968 the Brigham Young Alumnus was replaced by a tabloid newspaper named BYU Today. Following the tradition established by its immediate predecessor, BYU Today continued publication for well over two decades before becoming the Brigham Young Magazine in 1993. Immediately subsequent this name change, distribution of the magazine exceeded 130,000. In addition to a change in name, the magazine reduced its production frequency to the current quarterly schedule and also discontinued running advertisements for non-campus organizations. By 1997 the BYU Alumni began as another BYU alumni magazine, but in Spring 2001, the two publications were merged and became the current BYU Magazine.

In 2021, the publication changed its name to Y Magazine accompanying a redesign by Pentagram.

See also
 The Universe (student newspaper)
 List of alumni magazines

Notes

References

External links
 

1945 establishments in Utah
2001 establishments in Utah
Magazines established in 1945
Magazines established in 2001
Alumni magazines
Quarterly magazines published in the United States
Brigham Young University publications
Magazines published in Utah